P. K. Rosy (10 February 1903–1988) was an Indian actress in Malayalam cinema. She is the first actress in Malayalam cinema. She starred in the J. C. Daniel film Vigathakumaran, for which she was targeted by an angry mob because of her caste.

Early life 
She was born as Rajamma, on 10 February, 1903 at Nandankode Trivandrum to a Pulaya Christian family. Rosy's father Poulose was the cook of the foreign missionary parker of LMS church. Her father died when she was young leaving her family in poverty. She also regularly went to the local school of performing arts to study Kakkarissi Natakam.

Rosy's love for acting seems to have surpassed concerns she may have held for what the elements of society would call her.

Of the origin of her name "Rosy," many claim her family converted to Christianity and changed her name from Rajamma to Rosamma. Rosy and her husband did not disclose her past to anyone. Their children, while aware of some details, now live as Nairs (their father’s caste).

Career

By 1928, she performed Kakkirasi, harvest songs  and folk songs formed under the association of artists called "Cheramar Kalavedi" which became a training ground for entering into the yard of the Temple of art. The Kakkarasi drama troupe and Rajah Party Drama Troop competed with each other for Rosamma, this competetion enhanced the star value of the actress Rosamma. From this, she stepped in to become the heroine of JC Daniel's film after his first prospective heroine proved unsuited for the role. She played the character of Sarojini, a Nair woman, in the movie. When Vigathukumaran was released, members of the Nair community were enraged to see a Dalit woman portray a Nair. Many eminent members of the film industry at the time refused to come and inaugurate the opening of Vigathakumaran if Rosy was to be physically present there, including the famous lawyer Madhoor Govindan Pillai. Following a scene in which the main character kissed a flower in her hair, the audience threw stones at the screen. The director, Daniel, himself didn't invite her to the opening at Capitol theatre in Thiruvananthapuram, fearing a backlash but Rosy had attended anyway but was still made to watch a second showing by those boycotting the event. The crowd transformed into an angry mob which tore down the screen and damaged the theatre. Eventually, Rosy had to flee.

Legacy 
The story of the film was first rediscovered in the late 1960s by Chelangatt Gopalakrishnan while in 1971 Kunnukuzhi published his first article about her.

In 2013, Kamal directed a biopic on Daniel. The film is partially based on the novel Nashta Naayika by Vinu Abraham, and also deals with the life of Rosy. Newcomer Chandni Geetha portrays her. Two other films about her life have also been made: The Lost Child and Ithu Rosiyude Katha (This is Rosy’s Story). Women in Cinema Collective " WCC" which has been striving to make the workspace better for women in cinema launched Film society in Tribute to P K Rosy P K Rosy Smaraka Samithi  was inaugrated by Cinema Minister Thiruvanchoor Radhakrishnan at Press Club.

On 10 February 2023, Google honoured Rosy with a doodle, on the occasion of her 120th birthday.

References

External links
 Vigathakumaran in Alappuzha

1903 births
1975 deaths
Indian film actresses
20th-century Indian actresses
Actresses from Thiruvananthapuram
Actresses in Malayalam cinema
Women of the Kingdom of Travancore
People of the Kingdom of Travancore